Putscheid is a commune and village in north-eastern Luxembourg. It is part of the canton of Vianden.

, the village of Putscheid, which lies in the centre of the commune, has a population of 35.  Other villages within the commune include Bivels, Gralingen, Merscheid, Nachtmanderscheid, Stolzembourg, and Weiler.

Population

References

External links
 

 
Communes in Vianden (canton)
Villages in Luxembourg